Villanueva de Huerva is a municipality located in the province of Zaragoza, Aragon, Spain. According to the 2010 census, the municipality had a population of 562 inhabitants.

This town is named after the Huerva River.

See also
Campo de Cariñena
List of municipalities in Zaragoza

References

External links

Villanueva de Huerva - Tourism

Municipalities in the Province of Zaragoza